Oryba is a genus of moths in the family Sphingidae.

Species
Oryba achemenides (Cramer, 1779)
Oryba kadeni (Schaufuss, 1870)

Dilophonotini
Moth genera
Taxa named by Francis Walker (entomologist)